Tày or Thổ (a name shared with the unrelated Thổ and Cuoi languages) is the major Tai language of Vietnam, spoken by more than a million Tày people in Northeastern Vietnam.

Distribution
Vietnam: All over the country (mainly 15 provinces, including Cao Bang Province and Quang Ninh Province).
China: in the border area of Wenshan Prefecture, Yunnan and Guangxi (mainly Jingxi County)
Laos: North; unknown location.

Varieties
Tày linguistic varieties include the following:

Tày Bảo Lạc – spoken in Bảo Lạc District, western Cao Bang province.
Tày Trùng Khánh – spoken in Trùng Khánh District, northeastern Cao Bang province.
Thu Lao or Dai Zhuang varieties are considered to be a different language.

Phonology

Consonants 

 The Cao Bẳng Tày dialect is the only variety to have the sounds .

Vowels 

 There are also three semivowels  that mainly occur in syllable-coda position in combination with other vowel sounds.  are typically realized as consonant sounds .  follows front vowels  and central vowels .  follows back vowels  as well as central vowels . However,  only follows .

Tones 
Six tones are present in Cao Bẳng Tày:

Vocabulary

References 

Languages of Vietnam
Tai languages